MTSO may refer to:
 Methodist Theological School in Ohio
 Mobile Telephone Switching Office